Julus terrestris is a species of millipede from the family Julidae. It was described by Carl Linnaeus in his landmark 1758 10th edition of Systema Naturae. The species can be found in Austria, the Baltic states, Belarus, Czech Republic, Finland, Germany, Hungary, Poland, Romania, Slovakia, Ukraine, Scandinavia (except Norway), and all states of former Yugoslavia (except Bosnia and Herzegovina, North Macedonia, and Slovenia).

References

External links
Image of Julus curvicornis

Julida
Animals described in 1758
Taxa named by Carl Linnaeus
Millipedes of Europe